"(You Want to) Make a Memory" is a song by American rock band Bon Jovi, which was released as the first single from their tenth studio album Lost Highway (2007). Written by Jon Bon Jovi, Richie Sambora and Desmond Child, it was released for radio airplay on March 20, 2007, and for download on the US iTunes Store on April 17, 2007. The song is a ballad, and was performed at several nationally-televised events in an effort to promote the single. "(You Want to) Make a Memory" peaked at number 27 in the United States, making it Bon Jovi's last single to break the Top 40 on the Hot 100.

Two different versions of the song were released as singles. In every market except the U.S., the 'pop version' from the album was the single; in the U.S., however, a special 'country version' was released, which featured more instruments and a slightly different arrangement.

The song received a nomination at the 2008 Grammy Awards for Best Pop Performance by a Duo/Group with Vocals.

Background
Jon Bon Jovi came up with the title, music and most of the lyrics. Later he finished the lyrics with Desmond Child and Richie Sambora contributing a couple of lines in the lyrics. They finished the song in a couple of hours. While recording the song, Jon sat alone with Dann Huff in the booth playing acoustic guitar. Vocals, guitars, rhythm guitars and other parts were recorded following day.

"The beauty of '(You Want to) Make a Memory' is that it has the same feeling as 'Livin' on a Prayer'," noted Jon Bon Jovi in 2007. "Like we're starting in a whole new place again. I'll call it 'art' if it falls on its face and 'genius' if it works."

The video for the song was directed by Kevin Kerslake and shot in a bar called Layla's. Its storyline is based on the movie Ghost (1990) and is about a couple who is not together anymore. 
It was also inspired by the troubles Richie Sambora was going through in his own personal life at the time, such as the divorce with Heather Locklear, the custody battle in the middle of an alcohol addiction, and having lost his father to cancer. CMT hosted the exclusive on-air and wireless premieres of the video on Thursday, May 3, 2007. Video made its television world premiere on CMT's Top 20 Countdown and later bowed on CMT Mobile. The video was also available for free streaming at CMT's official website. That episode of CMT's Top 20 Countdown aired again on Friday, May 4, 2007 at 1:30 p.m. E.T./P.T.
 
Announced as the first single from Lost Highway on March 19, 2007, the song was released to radio stations on March 20, 2007. On the same day it was put on a stream on a band's official website. In the week of March 19, 2007, there were 185,000 streams of the song on band's website. For those who pre-ordered Lost Highway from May 10, 2007, iTunes Store offered an instant download of "(You Want to) Make a Memory" and live versions of "(You Want to) Make a Memory" and "Lost Highway" recorded at the Cannery Ballroom in Nashville.

Sven Philipp from Billboard gave a positive review: "Over a pulsing crescendo of acoustic guitars, piano and strings, Bon Jovi delivers his most soulful vocal in years, sounding relaxed and nostalgic as he offers '80s-soaked lines". Mike Kerwick from North Jersey Media Group stated "'Make a Memory' may not be as good as some of the band's all-time-great ballads ('Always' and "Bed of Roses" come to mind), but its steady build from beginning to end makes it worth a spin. It gets better with each progressive listen". Donald Gibson from Blogcritics said the song "covers much of the same ground, musically and thematically, as 'Bed of Roses'". Craig Semon from Telegram & Gazette called it "a well-crafted pop song that’s not afraid to be gooey and sentimental. With cushiony orchestration interspersed with sparkling guitar notes, the song builds gradually in its intensity and seductive charm". Ben Ratliff from The New York Times said that song "appeal[s] directly to a love interest; true to form, Mr. Bon Jovi employs the word 'baby' every time".

Track listing
 European CD Single 

 European CD Maxi Single 

 Japanese CD Single 

 United Kingdom CD Single 

 United Kingdom Limited 7" Single

Charts and certifications

Weekly charts

Year-end charts

Certifications

Release history

References

External links
 Stream the song from the record label's website

2007 singles
2007 songs
Bon Jovi songs
Songs written by Desmond Child
Songs written by Richie Sambora
Songs written by Jon Bon Jovi
2000s ballads
Rock ballads
Island Records singles
Mercury Nashville singles